This is a list of notable alumni of the University of San Francisco School of Law.

Academia
 Ifeoma Ajunwa (2007), writer and professor at the University of North Carolina School of Law
 Edward Imwinkelried (1969), Evidence Scholar and Professor at UC Davis School of Law
 Thomas Nazario (1975), noted professor, lawyer, and scholar of human rights and international children's rights

Arts, Entertainment, and Journalism
 Cupcake Brown (2001), author and lawyer, wrote A Piece of Cake: A Memoir
 Emily Compagno (2006), attorney, TV host, former National Football League cheerleader, Fox News Channel contributor
 John Corcoran, speechwriter for the Governor of California and White House staffer
 Jeff Gottesfeld (1981), novelist and television writer
 Kimberly Guilfoyle (1994), former assistant San Francisco district attorney and television personality
 Gini Graham Scott (1990), author 
 Dick Spotswood (1973), journalist and politician

Athletics
 Tatiana Lysenko (2005), Ukrainian gold medalist at the 1992 Summer Olympics and world champion gymnast 
 Marcus McElhenney (2014), lawyer and bronze medalist at the 2008 Summer Olympics
 Juliet Starrett (2003), two-time whitewater rafting world champion and CEO of CrossFit San Francisco
 Andy Wolfe, lawyer and noted college basketball player

Business
 Byington Ford (did not graduate), noted real estate developer
 Hekani Jakhalu Kense, businesswoman and social entrepreneur 
 Lloyd Levitin (1961), businessman and professor 
 Marjorie Scardino (1975), CEO of Pearson PLC, and the first woman to head a top 100 firm on the London Stock Exchange

Government and Politics

Members of Congress

 John Burton (1960), long-serving politician, member of the United States House of Representatives (1974-1983), California State Assembly (1965-1974; 1988–1996); California State Senate (1996-2004); and Chair of the California Democratic Party (1973-1974; 2009–2017)
 John F. Shelley (1932), member of the United States House of Representatives (1949-1964), Mayor of San Francisco (1964-1968), and member of the California State Senate (1939-1947)

Members of State Legislatures
 Randy Iwase (1974), member of the Hawaii Senate (1990-2000)
 Susan C. Lee (1982), member of the Maryland House of Delegates (2002-2015) and Maryland Senate (2015–present)
 Sylvia Luke (1995), member of the Hawaii House of Representatives (1999–present)
 J. Eugene McAteer, member of the California Senate (1959-1967)
 Bill Monning (1976), member of the California State Assembly (2008-2012) and California State Senate (2012-2020)
 Arthur Ohnimus (1921), Chief Clerk of the California State Assembly (1923-1937; 1941–1967)
 Frank S. Petersen (1951), member of the California Senate (1963-1967) and Judge on the Del Norte County Superior Court (1966-1988)

State and Territorial Executive Offices
 Ron Knecht (1995), Nevada State Controller (2015-2019) and member of the Nevada Assembly (2002-2004)
 Thomas C. Lynch (1929), 25th Attorney General of California (1964-1971) and District Attorney of San Francisco (1951-1964)
 Leo T. McCarthy (1958), Lieutenant Governor of California (1983-1995); member and Speaker of the California State Assembly (1969-1982); member of the San Francisco Board of Supervisors (1964-1968)
 Bill Schuette (1979), Michigan Attorney General (2011-2019), member of the United States House of Representatives (1985-1991), and Justice of the Michigan Court of Appeals (2003-2009)
 Faoa Aitofele Sunia (1975), Lieutenant Governor of American Samoa (2003-2013)

Municipal and Local Offices
 Angela Alioto (1983), civil rights attorney and member of the San Francisco Board of Supervisors (1989-1997)
 Matthew R. Beauchamp (1984), District Attorney of Colusa County, California (2016–present)
 David Brady (1976), District Attorney of Trinity County, California (2020–present)
 Michael Hennessey (1973), long-serving Sheriff of the City and County of San Francisco (1980–2012)
 John C. Houlihan, Mayor of Oakland (1961-1966)
 Suzy Loftus (2005), interim District Attorney of San Francisco (2019-2020)
 William J. Quinn (1925), Chief of the San Francisco Police Department (1929-1940)
 Jill Ravitch (1987), District Attorney of Sonoma County, California (2011–present)
 Anne Marie Schubert (1989), District Attorney of Sacramento County, California (2015–present)
 Katy Tang (2017), member and President of the San Francisco Board of Supervisors (2013-2019)
 Joseph E. Tinney (1933), member of the San Francisco Board of Supervisors (1961-1966) and San Francisco City Assessor (1966-1979)
 Brendon Woods (1996), Public Defender of Alameda County, California (2012–present)

Judicial and Legal Figures

National Supreme Court Justices
 Daniel Foley (1974), Justice of the Supreme Court of Palau (2013-present) and Hawaii Intermediate Court of Appeals (2000-2016)

Federal Judges

 Saundra Brown Armstrong (1977), Judge on the U.S. District Court, Northern District of California (1991–present)
 Ellen Carroll (1980), Judge on the United States Bankruptcy Court for the Central District of California (1998-2012)
 Peter M. Elliott (1953), Judge on the United States Bankruptcy Court for the Central District of California (1971-1989)
 Roger D. Foley (1946), long-serving and noted Chief Judge on the United States District Court for the District of Nevada (1962-1996) and Attorney General of Nevada (1959-1962)
 David Hagen (1959), Judge on United States District Court for the District of Nevada (1993-2005)
 George Bernard Harris (1926), Judge on the United States District Court for the Northern District of California (1946-1983) and San Francisco Municipal Court (1941-1946)
 Maria-Elena James (1978), Magistrate Judge on the United States District Court for the Northern District of California (1994-2018)
 Rene Lastreto (1981), Judge on the United States Bankruptcy Court for the Eastern District of California (2016-present)
 Mark N. Olds (1945), Judge on the United States District Court for the District of Hawaii
 Edward Joseph Schwartz (1939), Judge and Chief Judge of the United States District Court for the Southern District of California (1968-2000)
 William Thomas Sweigert (1923), Judge on the United States District Court for the Northern District of California (1959-1983) and the San Francisco County Superior Court (1949-1959)
 Herbert Ross (1964), Judge on the United States Bankruptcy Court for the District of Alaska (1993-2000)
 Lek von Kaesborg (1952), Magistrate Judge for the United States District Court for the Central District of California (1960s-1970s)
 Kandis Westmore (1997), Magistrate Judge on the United States District Court for the Northern District of California (2012–present)
 Frederick J. Woelflen (1946), Chief Magistrate and Justice of the United States District Court for the Northern District of California (1978-1992)
 Owen E. Woodruff Jr. (1952), Chief Magistrate and Judge on the United States District Court for the Northern District of California (1981-1984)

State Supreme Court Justices

 Ming Chin (1967), Justice of the Supreme Court of California (1996-2020)
 Martin Jenkins (1980), Justice of the Supreme Court of California (2020–present), California Courts of Appeal (2008-2019), and United States District Court for the Northern District of California (1997-2008)
 Buell A. Nesbett (1940), the first Chief Justice of the Alaska Supreme Court (1959-1970)
 Raymond L. Sullivan (1930), Justice of the Supreme Court of California (1966-1977) and California Courts of Appeal (1961-1966)
 Mary Jane Theis (1974), Justice and Chief Justice of the Supreme Court of Illinois (2010–present)

State Appellate Court Justices
 Herbert L. Ashby (1958), Justice of the California Courts of Appeal (1972-1992)
 John E. Benson (1955), Justice of the California Courts of Appeal (1986-1994) and San Francisco County Superior Court (1974-1986)
 Preston Devine (1927), Justice of the California Courts of Appeal (1966-1974)
 Robert L. Dossee (1960), Justice of the California Courts of Appeal (1979-1998) and San Francisco County Superior Court (1972-1979)
 Norman H. Elkington (1927), Justice of the California Courts of Appeal (1959-1988)
 Carl Evans (1950), Justice of the California Courts of Appeal and Fresno County Superior Court
 Daniel M. Hanlon (1964), Justice of the California Courts of Appeal (1992-2000) and San Francisco County Superior Court (1978-1992)
 Barbara J.R. Jones (1974), Justice of the California Courts of Appeal (1996-2020) and San Francisco County Superior Court (1992-1996)
 Robert F. Kane (1952), Justice of the California Courts of Appeal (1971-1979), San Mateo County Superior Court (1969-1971), and the United States Ambassador to Ireland (1984-1985)
 Donald B. King (1958), Justice of the California Courts of Appeal (1982-1996)
 William R. McGuiness (1972), Justice of the California Courts of Appeal (2002–present) and Alameda County Superior Court (1986-1997)
 John B. Molinari (1933), Justice of the California Courts of Appeal (1962-1977) and on the San Francisco County Superior Court (1950s)
 Joanne Parrilli (1974), Justice of the California Courts of Appeal (1995-2007) and on the Alameda County Superior Court (1988-1995)
 James Richman (1965), Justice of the California Courts of Appeal (2006-present) and Alameda County Superior Court (1997-2006)
 Maria P. Rivera (1974), Justice of the California Courts of Appeal (2002-2018) and Contra Costa County Superior Court (1996-2002)
 Allison M. Rouse (1948), Justice of California Courts of Appeal (1971-1988) and San Francisco County Superior Court (1967-1971)
 James Ward (1959), Justice of the California Courts of Appeal (1996-present)
 Charles Wilson (2002), Justice of the California Courts of Appeal (2021-present) and Santa Clara County Superior Court (2014-present)

State Trial Court Judges
 Stephen P. Acquisto (1994), Judge on the Sacramento County Superior Court (2014-present)
 Arthur J. Anderson (1935), Judge on the Lassen County Superior Court (1973-1979)
 Byron Arnold (1930), Judge on the San Francisco County Superior Court (1955-1971)
 Lorenzo Arredondo (1972), Judge on Lake County Circuit Court (1986-2010)
 Joseph G. Babich (1951), Judge on the Sacramento County Superior Court (1964-1984)
 Lindi L. Baker (1984), Judge on the Josephine County Circuit Court (2005-present)
 David Ballati (1975), Judge on the San Francisco County Superior Court (1995-2009)
 James D. Barbolino (1969), Judge on the Placer County Superior Court (1984-2004)
 Martha Beckwith (1976), Judge on the Alaskan District Court for Anchorage (1984-1992)
 James G. Bertoli (1985), Judge on the Sonoma County Superior Court (2000–present)
 John J. Bible (1959), Judge on the San Mateo County Superior Court (1978-1993)
 John J. Boskovich (1953), Judge on the Sacramento County Superior Court (1970s-1980s)
 Nathaniel Bradley (1947), Judge on the Tulare County Superior Court (1971-1988)
 J. Michael Brown (1964), Judge on the Humboldt County Superior Court (1982-2018)
 Jackie Brown (1977), Judge on the Orange County Superior Court (2008-present)
 Neal Cabrinha (1967), Judge on the Santa Clara County Superior Court (1998-2013)
 Walter F. Calcagno (1948), Judge on the San Francisco County Superior Court (1969-1985)
 Roland Candee (1978), Judge on the Sacramento County Superior Court (1992-2012)
 Michael Candela (1987), Judge on the Butte County Superior Court (2010-present)
 Robert E. Carey (1948), Judge on the San Mateo County Superior Court (1971-1989)
 C. Harold Caulfield (1916), Judge on the San Francisco County Superior Court (1956-1971)
 James G. Changaris (1951), Judge on the Sutter County Superior Court (1982-1988)
 Robert D. Chapman (1951), Judge on the Santa Clara County Superior Court (1980-1990s)
 Leeland J. Cole-Chu (1978), Judge on the New London County Superior Court (2012-present)
 Marie Bertillion Collins (1958), Judge on the Alameda County Superior Court (1970-1995)
 Steve Counelis (1988), Judge on the Riverside County Superior Court (1992-present)
 Frank J. Creede Jr. (1950), Judge on the Fresno County Superior Court (1973-1998)
 Melvin I. Cronin (1921), Judge on the San Francisco County Superior Court (1944-1977)
 Ray Cunningham (1973), Judge on the Santa Clara County Superior Court (1984-2008)
 Thomas J. Dandurand (1960), Judge on the San Francisco County Superior Court (1971-1994)
 John Davidson (1981), Judge on the San Diego County Superior Court (1994-2010)
 Michael Robert Deems (1985), Judge on the Butte County Superior Court (2012-present)
 Louis B. Dematteis (1933), Judge on the San Mateo County Superior Court (1953-1973)
 N. Edward Denton (1952), Judge on the Mono County Superior Court (1985-1998)
 Joseph Desmond (1960), Judge on the San Francisco County Superior Court (1998-2002) and San Francisco Municipal Court (1983-1998)
 Ralph V. De Voto (1932), Judge on the Lake County Superior Court (1969-1983)
 Ursula Jones Dickson (1998), Judge on the Alameda County Superior Court (2013-present)
 Carly Dolan (1998), Judge on the Mendocino County Superior Court (2017–present)
 Sean Dowling (1974), Judge on the Nevada County Superior Court (2005-2015)
 Stephen Drew (1972), Judge on the Tulare County Superior Court (1990-2010)
 Robert J. Drewes (1948), Judge on the San Francisco County Superior Court (1966-1980)
 Terrance R. Duncan (1966), Judge on the Monterey County Superior Court (1995-2011)
 Lynn Duryee (1979), Judge on the Marin County Superior Court (1993-2014)
 Kristine Eagle (1989), Judge on the San Joaquin County Superior Court (2016-present)
 Rochelle C. East (1996), Judge on the San Francisco County Superior Court (2013–present)
 Arthur Eissinger (1951), Judge on the Sacramento County Superior Court (1966-1987)
 Wayne Ellison (1975), Judge on the Fresno County Superior Court (1995-2015)
 John A. Ertola (1954), Judge on the San Francisco County Superior Court (1970-1991) and member of the San Francisco Board of Supervisors
 Lyle R. Edson (1948), Judge on the San Mateo County Superior Court (1969-1983)
 Coleman Fannin (1959), Judge on the Contra Costa County Superior Court (1972-1988)
 Robert Fairwell (1951), Judge on the Alameda County Superior Court (1967-2007)
 Thomas E. Feeney (1944), Judge on the San Francisco County Superior Court (1966-1967)
 Lee Felice (1974), Judge on the Kern County Superior Court (1990s-2012)
 William F. Ferroggiaro Jr. (1962), Judge on the Humboldt County Superior Court (1983-1997)
 Richard P. Figone (1961), Judge on the San Francisco County Superior Court (1981-1996)
 Jeffrey R. Finigan (1993), Judge on the San Mateo County Superior Court (2015-present)
 Ralph Flageollet (1950), Judge on the San Francisco County Superior Court (1979-2000)
 Eric Fleming (1995), Judge on the San Francisco County Superior Court (2018–present)
 Paul Flynn (1968), Judge on the Los Angeles County Superior Court (1989-2006)
 Robert Foiles (1984), Judge on the San Mateo County Superior Court (2006-present)
 Bryan Foster (1974), Judge on the San Bernardino County Superior Court (2003-present)
 Frank C. Francis (1962), Judge on the Nevada County Superior Court (1977-1997)
 Jose S. Franco (1998), Judge on the Santa Clara County Superior Court (2015-present)
 Gail Fraties (1966), Judge on the Bethel County Superior Court (1986-1989)
 Donald Fretz (1951), Judge on the Merced County Superior Court (1963-1990)
 John J. Gallagher (1965), Judge on the Sonoma County Superior Court (1976-1997)
 James Garbolino (1969), Judge on the Placer County Superior Court (1987-2007)
 David A. Garcia (1970), Judge on the San Francisco County Superior Court (1990-2003) and Municipal Court (1983-1990)
 Lupe Garcia (1995), Judge on the Alameda County Superior Court (2016-present)
 Mark A. Garcia (1995), Judge on the Merced County Superior Court (2007-2015)
 Richard C. Garner (1957), Judge on the San Bernardino Superior Court (1971-1990s)
 Steven Gevercer (1983), Judge on the Sacramento County Superior Court (2012-present)
 Virginia George (1984), Judge on the Contra Costa County Superior Court (2017-present)
 Patrick D. Gilroy (1960), Judge on the Fifth Circuit Court of Oregon (1974-2005)
 Raymond J. Giordano (1970), Judge on the Sonoma County Superior Court (1981-2006)
 Joseph M. Golden (1916), Judge on the San Francisco County Superior Court (1956-1971)
 Larry J. Goodman (1974), Judge on the Alameda County Superior Court (1984-2017)
 David Gottlieb (1987), Judge on the Fresno County Superior Court (2005-present)
 Patricia A. Gray (1984), Judge on the Sonoma County Superior Court (1994-2000)
 Michael R. Griffin (1968), Judge on the Carson County District Court (1979-2007)
 Paul Haakenson (1993), Judge on the Marin County Superior Court (2006–present)
 John Griffin (1965), Judge on the Stanislaus County Superior Court (1989-2006)
 Susan L. Hahn (1982), Judge on the Yakima County Superior Court (1990-2017)
 Harold Haley (1928), Judge on the Marin County Superior Court (1965-1970) and victim of the Marin County Civic Center attacks (1970)
 Barry Hammer (1962), Judge on the San Luis Obispo Superior Court (1985-2006)
 Barry Harding (1984), Judge on the San Francisco County Superior Court (2001-present)
 Frank Hart (1952), Judge on the San Francisco County Superior Court (1984-2000s)
 Leighton Hatch (1954), Judge on the Sacramento County Superior Court (1974-1994) and Director of the California Department of Consumer Affairs (1969-1972)
 Richard James Henderson (1974), Judge on the Mendocino County Superior Court (2000-2016)
 Brian E. Hill (1981), Judge on the Santa Barbara County Superior Court (2003-present)
 Christopher M. Honigsberg (2005), Judge on the Sonoma County Superior Court (2018–present)
 Peggy Hora (1978), Judge on the Alameda County Superior Court (1984-2005)
 John Ing (1977), Judge on the Los Angeles County Superior Court (2007-present)
 William Jacka (1919), Judge on the Santa Clara County Superior Court (1940s-1950s)
 Harry Jacobs (1968), Judge on the Merced County Superior Court (2012-present)
 Margaret Johnson (1978), Judge on the Santa Clara County Superior Court (2000-2018)
 Alesia F. Jones (1991), Judge on the Solano County Superior Court (2008–present)
 Joseph Karesh (1933), Judge on the San Francisco County Superior Court (1960-1978)
 Robert M. Kawahara (1980), Judge on the Los Angeles County Superior Court (2002-present)
 Terence Keeley (1963), Judge on the Sutter County Superior Court (1978-1993)
 Kenneth R. Kingsbury (1975), Judge on the Alameda County Superior Court (1995-2008)
 Nona L. Klippen (1988), Judge on the Santa Clara County Superior Court (2015-present)
 Roger Kosel (1973), Judge on the Siskiyou County Superior Court (2007-2009)
 Christopher E. Krueger (1994), Judge on the Sacramento County Superior Court (2011-present)
 William F. Lanam (1959), Judge on the San Mateo County Superior Court (1972-1990)
 Leland J. Lazarus (1929), Judge on the San Francisco County Superior Court (1965-1974)
 Kenneth L. Lewis (1946), Judge on the Kitsap County District Court
 James Libbey (1968), Judge on the Contra Costa County Superior Court (1981-2008)
 Frank J. Mackin (1928), Judge on the Los Angeles County Superior Court (1961-1971)
 Runston Maino (1968), Judge on the San Diego County Superior Court (1987-present)
 Jordan L. Martinelli (1921), Judge on the Marin County Superior Court (1949-1961)
 Lawrence W. Marvin (1953), Judge on the Sacramento County Superior Court (1985-1990s)
 Leonard H. McBride (1953), Judge on the Orange County Superior Court (1979-2002)
 Thomas F. McBride (1940), Judge on the Contra Costa County Superior Court (1965-1981)
 Brigid McCann (1991), Judge on the San Bernardino Superior Court (2008-present)
 John A. McCarthy (1974), Judge on the Pierce County Superior Court (1997-2014)
 James McFetridge (1985), Judge on the Sacramento County Superior Court (2006-present)
 William McGivern (1970), Judge on the Marin County Superior Court (1998-2003)
 Charles J. McGolderick (1929), Judge on the Sonoma County Superior Court (1951-1968)
 E. Warren McGuire (1950), Judge on the Marin County Superior Court (1968-1988)
 Michael McInnes (1951), Judge on the Solano County Superior Court (1979-1991)
 Kevin McKenney (1973), Judge on the Santa Clara County Superior Court (2005-2014)
 Christopher McKenzie (1969), Judge on the First Circuit Court District of Hawaii (2002-present)
 Winton McKibben (1952), Judge on the Alameda County Superior Court (1976-1995)
 Barbara Miller (1978), Judge on the Alameda County Superior Court (1996-2009)
 James Mize (1974), Judge on the Sacramento County Superior Court (2008-present)
 Edward Molkenbuhr (1920), Judge on the San Francisco County Superior Court (1949-1960)
 John M. Monterosso (1990), Judge on the Riverside County Superior Court (2007-present)
 Heather D. Morse (1981), Judge on the Santa Cruz County Superior Court (1989-2017)
 Hugh F. Mullin Jr. (1932), Judge on the San Mateo County Superior Court (1934-1949)
 Kevin Murphy (1984), Judge on the Contra Costa County Superior Court (2006-present)
 Stephen Murphy (1981), Judge on the San Francisco County Superior Court (2017–present)
 Gary Nadler (1979), Judge on the Sonoma County Superior Court (2002–present)
 Clifford L. Nakea (1971), Judge on the Fifth Circuit Court of Hawaii (1978-2004)
 Karlene Navarro (2007), Judge on the Sonoma County Superior Court (2021–present)
 Rene Navarro (1975), Judge on Santa Clara County Superior Court (1994-2006)
 Harold Neville (1960), Judge on the Humboldt County Superior Court (1972-1994)
 Diane Northway (1969), Judge on the Santa Clara County Superior Court (1990-2013)
 Marco Nunez (2000), Judge on the Imperial County Superior Court (2017-present)
 Timothy W. O'Brien (1949), Judge on the Mendocino County Superior Court (1971-1985)
 William A. O'Brien (1926), Judge on the San Francisco County Superior Court (1963-1970)
 Agnes O'Brien Smith (1941), Judge on the San Francisco County Superior Court (1970-1978)
 Raymond J. O'Connor (1931), Judge on the San Francisco County Superior Court (1964-1969)
 Edward O'Day Jr. (1936), Judge on the San Francisco County Superior Court (1960-1972) 
 Lynn O'Malley Taylor (1972), Judge on the Marin County Superior Court (1990-2004)
 Robert O'Neill (1965), Judge on the San Diego County Superior Court (1978-2000s)
 Frank J. Passalacqua (1962), Judge on the Sonoma County Superior Court (1964-2001)
 Claude D. Perasso (1953), Judge on the San Francisco County Superior Court (1971-2006)
 Rosemary Pfeiffer (1976), Judge on the San Mateo County Superior Court (1991-2011)
 Gary M. Picetti (1972), Judge on the Alameda County Superior Court (2015-present)
 Daniel A. Quinlan (1948), Judge on the Nez Perce County District Court (1970-1973)
 John Quinlen (1965), Judge on the Kern County Superior Court (1991-2007)
 Dawna Reeves (1995), Judge on the Stanislaus County Superior Court (2008-present)
 Benjamin Reyes (1992), Judge on the Contra Costa County Superior Court (2017-present)
 Enrique Romero (1976), Judge on the Los Angeles County Superior Court (1988-1999)
 Roger Ross (1974), Judge on the San Joaquin County Superior Court (2007-present)
 T.W. Salter (1972), Judge on the Stanislaus County Superior Court (2006-present)
 Reginald Saunders (1984), Judge on the Alameda County Superior Court (1995-2015)
 Philip Schafer (1964), Judge on the Orange County Superior Court (1988-2000)
 Kirstin Schoonover, Judge on the Superior Court of Vermont (2015-present)
 Robert L. Schouweiler (1965), Judge of the Second District Court of Nevada (1981-1991)
 William Edmund Scott (1923), Judge on the San Mateo County Superior Court (1946-1971)
 Aram Serverian (1967), Judge on the San Mateo County Superior Court (1986-2000)
 Nancy Case Shaffer (1977), Judge on the Sonoma County Superior Court (2011-2021)
 Frank W. Shaw (1953), Judge on the San Francisco County Superior Court (1971-1980s)
 LeRoy A. Simmons (1967), Judge on the San Bernardino County Superior Court (1994-2004)
 Donald Smith (1951), Judge on the San Diego County Superior Court (1979-1987)
 Peter Smith (1951), Judge on the Marin County Superior Court (1979-1991)
 Vernon Smith (1968), Judge on the Marin County Superior Court (1982-2007)
 Andrew E. Sweet (1992), Judge on the Marin County Superior Court (2009–present)
 G. Dave Teja (1958), Judge on the Sutter County Superior Court (1978-1990s)
 Gary W. Thomas (1961), Judge on the Marin County Superior Court (1986-1998)
 Ronald I. Toff (1973), Judge on the Santa Clara County Superior Court (2010-present)
 William F. Traverso (1918), Judge on the San Francisco County Superior Court (1945-1965) 
 Ksenia Tsenin (1973), Judge of the San Francisco County Superior Court (1998-2017)
 Charles R. Tunley (1964), Judge on the Alaskan Superior Court for Nome (1980-1995)
 Robert Twiss (1976), Judge on the Sacramento County Superior Court (2009-present)
 Steven Unpingco (1982), Judge on the Superior Court of Guam (1994-2011)
 Herman A. Van Der Zee (1922), Judge on the San Francisco County Superior Court (1947-1972)
 Rafael Varquez (2004), Judge on the Monterey County Superior Court (2017-present)
 W. Lee Vavuris (1944), Judge on the San Francisco County Superior Court (1971-1982)
 Luis M. Villareal (1975), Judge on the Solano County Superior Court (1997-2005) and Municipal Court (1982-1997)
 Dorothy von Beroldingen (1954), Judge on the San Francisco County Superior Court (1977-1999) and member of the San Francisco Board of Supervisors (1966-1977)
 Marcia J. Waldorf (1975), Judge on the First Circuit Court of Hawaii (1985-2007)
 Denise Whitehead (1986), Judge on the Fresno County Superior Court (2001-2021)
 Raymond D. Williamson (1963), Judge on the San Francisco County Superior Court (1985-1998)
 Mary E. Wiss (1981), Judge on the San Francisco County Superior Court (2001–present)
 Beverly Wood (1983), Judge on the Marin County Superior Court (2013-2021)
 Douglas R. Woodworth (1952), Judge on the San Diego County Superior Court (1972-1988) and San Diego Municipal Court (1968-1972)

Local Judges
 Charles E. Aguilar (1960), Judge on the Stanislaus County Municipal Court (1977-1998)
 Jeffrey S. Allen (1973), Judge on the Alameda County Municipal Court (1985-1990s)
 John M. Allen (1969), Judge on the Alameda County Municipal Court (1984-1990s)
 Clifford B. Bachand (1951), Judge on the Alameda County Municipal Court (1976-1980s)
 George T. Choppelas (1961), Judge on the San Francisco Municipal Court (1982-1990s)
 Frank J. Comaich (1930), Judge on the San Mateo County Municipal Court (1960-1973)
 Thomas F. Curtin (1954), Judge on the Contra Costa County Municipal Court (1971-1990s)
 Dan B. Eymann (1947), Judge on the Fresno County Municipal Court (1954-1977)
 John J. Fahey (1931), Judge on the San Mateo County Municipal Court (1940-1949)
 Richard D. Gravelle (1954), Judge on the San Mateo County Municipal Court (1984-1986)
 Kiernan R. Hyland (1950), Judge on the Sonoma County Municipal Court (1972-1981)
 James E. Jones Jr. (1950), Judge on the Sonoma County Municipal Court (1972-1981)
 William J. Mallen (1961), Judge on the San Francisco Municipal Court (1982-1992)
 George E. Maloney (1931), Judge on the San Francisco Municipal Court (1961-1976)
 Lewis May (1948), Judge on the Alameda County Municipal Court (1969-1989)
 George E. McDonald (1949), Judge on the Alameda County Municipal Court (1966-1985)
 Ronald McGaw (1987), Judge on the City Court of Poughkeepsie (1996-2006)
 Alexander McMahon (1951), Judge on the Sonoma County Municipal Court (1966-1976)
 John J. McMahon (1925), Judge on the San Francisco Municipal Court
 Steven D. McMorris (1969), Judge on the Douglas County Court of Justice (1984-?)
 J. Dominique Olcomendy (1959), Judge on the San Francisco Municipal Court (1974-1995) 
 Roy G. Pucci (1948), Judge on the Alameda County Municipal Court (1966-1970s) 
 Raymond H. Simmons (1955), Judge on the Monterey County Municipal Court (1971-1998)
 Douglas J. Smith (1973), Judge on the King County District Court (1990-2018)
 Michael Tamony (1962), Judge on the San Francisco Municipal Court (1982-1992)
 Caron Taylor (1951), Judge on the Stanislaus County Municipal Court (1977-1984)
 Eric R. Uldall (1970), Judge on the Solano County Municipal Court (1984-1990s)
 James C. Walsh Jr. (1946), Judge on the Alameda County Municipal Court (1977-1980s)
 James S. White (1966), Judge on the Alameda County Municipal Court (1979-1990s) 
 Russell Zaches (1936), Judge on the Monterey County Municipal Court
 Ernest C. Zunino (1963), Judge on the Marin County Municipal Court (1985-1990s)

Judges of Other Courts
 Theodore Bofinger (1950), Federal Administrative Law Judge (1963-1985)
 Thomas Patrick Brady (1948), Federal Administrative Law Judge (1967-1993)
 Judith A. Epstein (1977), Judge on the State Bar Court of California
 Tamia Gordon (1997), Administrative Law Judge of the Social Security Administration (2014-2018) and United States Department of Health and Human Services (2018-2020)
 Christopher Knowdell (1997), Federal Administrative Law Judge of the Social Security Administration (2016-present)
 Alfonso Montano (1980), Administrative Law Judge (1994-2009)
 Abel Shapiro (1978), Administrative Law Judge (1989-2011)

Other Legal Figures

 Tom Asimou (1998), noted lawyer specializing in missing persons cases
 Thomas Anthony Durkin (1973), criminal defense and civil rights attorney
 Vincent Hallinan (1918), noted lawyer and the Progressive Party candidate in the 1952 United States presidential election
 Frederick J. Kenney (1991), Judge Advocate General of the United States Coast Guard (2011-2014)
 Jay Leiderman (1999), criminal defense lawyer noted for work with cases involving computer hacking
 Mark Massara (1987), Director of the Sierra Club Coastal Programs and environmental lawyer
 Kevin V. Ryan (1984), United States Attorney for the Northern District of California (2002-2007) 
 Patricia A. Shiu (1982), Director of the Federal Contract Compliance (2009-2016) and employment attorney
 Joe Alioto Veronese (2000), civil rights attorney and civil servant 
 Chan Chung Wing (1918), immigration and civil rights attorney; and the first Chinese American lawyer in California

Further reading
 Abrahamson, Eric. The University of San Francisco School of Law, A History, 1912-1978. The University of San Francisco, 1987.
 Ziajka, Alan. Legacy and Promise: 150 Years of Jesuit Education at the University of San Francisco. The University of San Francisco, 2005.
 Ziajka, Alan. The University of San Francisco School of Law Century. The University of San Francisco, 2012.
 Ziajka, Alan. USF Firsts, Facts, Honors, and Achievements 1855-2017. The University of San Francisco, 2017.

References

 
University of San Francisco School of Law